Annunciation Church may refer to:

Albania
Annunciation Church, Kozarë
Annunciation Church, Mjekës
Annunciation Monastery, Albania, in Vanistër

Greece
Our Lady of Tinos

Malta
Annunciation Church, Balzan
Annunciation Church, Mdina
Annunciation Church, Tarxien
Annunciation Chapel, Victoria

Republic of Ireland
Ballaghaderreen Cathedral

Italy 
 Santissima Annunziata (disambiguation), various churches and basilicas

Latvia
Annunciation of Our Most Holy Lady Church, Riga

Romania
Annunciation Church, Alba Iulia
Annunciation Church, Sibiu

Russia
Annunciation Cathedral, Voronezh
Annunciation Church of the Alexander Nevsky Lavra, Saint Petersburg

Ukraine
Annunciation Cathedral, Kharkiv

United Kingdom
Annunciation Church, Chesterfield
Annunciation Church, Walsall

United States
Annunciation Roman Catholic Church (Denver), Colorado
Annunciation Church (Leadville, Colorado), in National Historic Landmark Leadville Historic District
Annunciation Greek Orthodox Cathedral of New England, Boston, Massachusetts
Annunciation Melkite Catholic Cathedral, Boston, Massachusetts
Annunciation Greek Orthodox Church of Newburyport, Massachusetts
Annunciation Greek Orthodox Church (Manhattan), New York, New York
Annunciation Church (historic) (Cleveland, Ohio)
Annunciation Church (Houston), Texas
Annunciation Greek Orthodox Cathedral (Houston), Texas
Annunciation Greek Orthodox Church, Wauwatosa, Wisconsin

See also
Church of the Annunciation (disambiguation)
Annunciation Cathedral (disambiguation)